Daniel L. Cease (March, 25 1864 in Phillipsburg, New Jersey - March 22, 1928 in Cleveland, Ohio) was editor and manager of The Railroad Trainman in Cleveland, Ohio. The publication was a monthly published by the Brotherhood of Railroad Trainmen In 1913 and again in 1926 he was on the Board of Arbitration of the Interstate Commerce Commission.

Publications
The Railroad trainman, Volume 29 (1912)
Disability And Death Compensation For Railroad Employees (1913)

See also
Brotherhood of Locomotive Firemen

References

1864 births
1928 deaths
American magazine editors
American people in rail transportation
Brotherhood of Railroad Trainmen people
People from Phillipsburg, New Jersey